InterSector is a Western Australian government publication that followed the earlier Public Service notices (Perth, W.A.).
The formal title is InterSector : official newsletter of the Western Australian Public Sector.

Articles in the publication include history of various government instrumentalities, as well as items of information about government funded bodies.

See also
 Western Australian Government Gazette

References

1995 establishments in Australia
Government of Western Australia